Arba Vijaya is a very old residential area in Pokhara sub-metropolitan city in Kaski District in the Gandaki Zone of northern-central Nepal. At the time of the 1991 Nepal census it had a population of 3,446 persons living in 714 individual households. village located at surrounding mountain Himalaya it is a destination in Anna Purna Himalaya Region. One can reach there from Pokhara within 2 hours by walking for 30 min by driving village has many natural sources, most of people living at villages are Brahmin, chettri, Gurung, Bishwakarma, Pariyar
caste.

Geography 
Located north east of Pokhara valley, it is surrounded by Vijayapur river in south and east whereas kaunkhola is in west. Mauja village lies on north of arba.
Arba is divided into hill and plain land. Majority of people live in hill whereas influx of people is getting higher in plain area from other near villages such as Sikles, Taprang, Kalika, Tarkang and Tangting.

References

External links
UN map of the municipalities of Kaski District

Populated places in Kaski District
Neighbourhoods in Pokhara